Osieki may refer to the following places:
Osieki, Bytów County in Pomeranian Voivodeship (north Poland)
Osieki, Słupsk County in Pomeranian Voivodeship (north Poland)
Osieki, Warmian-Masurian Voivodeship (north Poland)
Osieki, West Pomeranian Voivodeship (north-west Poland)